Shree Swaminarayan Gurukul Rajkot Sansthan, commonly known as Rajkot Gurukul or Swaminarayan Gurukul, is a Hindu religious and educational organization with headquarters in Rajkot, Gujarat. The organization is within the Laxmi Narayan Dev Gadi of the Swaminarayan Sampraday.

The goal of the organization is to spread the Sadvidya (true education) that was championed by Bhagwan Swaminarayan. The organization also aims to teach Indian cultural heritage through branches around the world. Its major branches in India include Rajkot, Junagadh, Surat, Poicha (Nilkanthdham), Hyderabad, Taravada, and Bangalore. Its international branches include Dallas, Paramus (New Jersey) and Atlanta, all in the United States.

History 
Shastriji Maharaj Shri Dharmajivandasji Swami was inspired to found an educational institution after a pilgrimage to Badrinath (an abode of Badrinarayan on Himalaya) in 1946. 

The organization was established in 1947 in Rajkot by Shastriji Maharaj with support from Pujya Purani Swami Shree Premprakashdasji Swami, Pujya Mugat Swami Shree Nitrannamuktadasji Swami, and Tribhuvan Gaurishankar Vyas. The organization started teaching on 16 June 1948 with seven students in a rented house in Rajkot. The foundation stone of Shree Swaminarayan Gurukul at Rajkot was laid on 5 November 1948. 

In 1974, Shastriji Maharaj gave the administrative duties of the organization to its current leader, Guruvarya Shri Devkrushnadasji Swami. 

In 2022 then Indian Prime minister Narendra Modi gave a virtual address at the Rajkot branch.

Academics 
The word Gurukul is combination of two Sanskrit words: "Guru", meaning teacher or master, and "Kula" meaning 'abode'. 

Swaminarayan Gurukul provides three types of education:  Vidya (Modern Science), Sadvidya (Traditional Education), and Brahmvidya (Spiritual Education).

Vidya – modern education 
Modern education (including science and technology) includes the aspects of knowledge, curiosity, creativity, leadership, and dynamism (adapting to the changes on the move).

Sadvidya – traditional education 
Traditional education includes the values and ethics found in Indian culture and history. These values include:

 Integrity 
 Empathy 
 Non-violence: Valuing the life of every living organism.
 Gratefulness: Having an appreciation and being conscious towards God, saints, guardians, seniors, and natural resources.
 Freedom from awful propensities: refraining from insults, smoking, alcohol, drugs, enslavement, infidelity, gambling, etc.

Brahmavidya – spiritual education 
Aspects of spiritual education include: 

 Faith: including faith in the scriptures and obedience to divine rules and laws
 Devotion: includes reverential practices like chanting mantras, singing kirtans, prayer, and service (Seva) to God. 
 Atmanistha: Realizing oneself as a simple Soul, confined from the body, as a humble Sevak of God
 Non-attachment: detaching oneself from materialistic objects and interests (wealth, popularity) to better focus on God.
 Realisation of God: Encountering God in reality.
 Affection with saintly persons: Having positive relationships with saints and devotees.

Foundation

Aims & Objectives 
To propagate and promote Bhagwan Shree Swaminarayan's Message

 Building the best character of pupils through credible education.
 Establish comprehensive development in every zone.
 Prepare students to be the best patriots.
 Creating secular harmony for all types of religions.
 Equalize between modernity and spirituality.

References

External links
Rajkot Gurukul Website

Swaminarayan Sampradaya
Rajkot
Education International
Spirituality
1948 establishments in India
Educational institutions established in 1948